Itasca is a word coined by Henry Schoolcraft and may refer to:

 Lake Itasca, the source of the Mississippi River


Places in the United States
 Itasca County, Minnesota
 Itasca Township, Clearwater County, Minnesota
 Itasca Township, Sherman County, Kansas
 Itasca State Park, Minnesota
 Itasca, Illinois
 Itasca, Texas
 South Itasca, Wisconsin
 Itascatown, a historical settlement on Howland Island named after the United States Coast Guard Cutter Itasca (see below)
 Itaska Street (St. Louis), a road in St. Louis, Missouri

Ships in the United States
 , a United States Coast Guard cutter in commission from 1930 to 1941 and from 1946 to 1950, famous for her role during the disappearance of Amelia Earhart in 1937
 , the name of more than one United States Navy ship

Other
Itasca, a brand of recreational vehicles produced by Winnebago Industries

Henry Schoolcraft neologisms